Diogo Kachuba (born 16 February 1990) is a Brazilian professional footballer who plays as a midfielder for Deportivo San Pedro, in Guatemala.

References

1990 births
Living people
Brazilian footballers
Criciúma Esporte Clube players
Americano Futebol Clube players
América Futebol Clube (RN) players
Hapoel Jerusalem F.C. players
Bnei Sakhnin F.C. players
Hapoel Kfar Saba F.C. players
Hapoel Bnei Lod F.C. players
Club Aurora players
Deportivo San Pedro players
Liga Leumit players
Israeli Premier League players
Expatriate footballers in Israel
Expatriate footballers in Bolivia
Expatriate footballers in Guatemala
Brazilian expatriate sportspeople in Israel
Brazilian expatriate sportspeople in Bolivia
Brazilian expatriate sportspeople in Guatemala
Association football midfielders
People from Cascavel
Sportspeople from Paraná (state)